Daxing Township is a township under the administration of Heishan County, Liaoning, China. , it has eight villages under its administration.

References 

Township-level divisions of Liaoning
Heishan County